The Pan American Weightlifting Federation (PAWF) was established in 1951. The federation is the body that governs and oversees weightlifting sports in North America, Central America, South America and the Caribbean.

Events organized

Senior
 Pan American Weightlifting Championships (since 1982)
 Pan American Masters Weightlifting Championships (since 1998)
 Online Pan American Weightlifting Championships (since 2020)
 Ibero-American Weightlifting Championships 
 South American Weightlifting Championships
 Simon Bolivar Weightlifting Championships (26th in 2010)

Junior
 Pan American Junior Weightlifting Championships 
 South American Junior Weightlifting Championships

Youth
 Pan American Youth Weightlifting Championships
 South American Youth Weightlifting Championships

See also
 Weightlifting at the Pan American Games

References

External links
Pan American Weightlifting Federation

International sports organizations
Weightlifting
Sports organizations established in 1951